Seredeysky is an urban-type settlement in Sukhinichsky District, Kaluga Oblast, Russia. Population:

References

Notes

Sources

Urban-type settlements in Kaluga Oblast